Æthelwine of Sceldeforde was a seventh century saint, venerated in the Roman Catholic and Eastern Orthodox churches, who lived in Anglo-Saxon England.
He is known to history from records in the hagiography of the Secgan Manuscript. He was venerated as a saint after his death, though some question his historical authenticity.

His name comes from two Anglo-Saxon words, aethel (prince) and wine (friend protector).  Æthelwine was a common name in the Anglo-Saxon era.

References

7th-century Christian saints
Medieval English saints